Death Delights is a 2001 Ned Kelly Award-winning novel by the Australian author Gabrielle Lord.

Awards
Ned Kelly Awards for Crime Writing, Best Novel, 2002: winner

Notes
Dedication: "To Greg, the original Reginald, and to all the friends of Bill W."
This novel is the first in the Jack McCain series, followed by Lethal Factor (2003) and Dirty Weekend (2005).

Reviews
 "Australian Crime Fiction Database" 

Australian crime novels
2001 Australian novels
Ned Kelly Award-winning works